XIII may refer to:
 13 (number) or XIII in Roman numerals
 13th century in Roman numerals
 XIII (comics), a Belgian comic book series by Jean Van Hamme and William Vance
 XIII (2003 video game), a 2003 video game based on the comic book series
 XIII (2020 video game), a remake of the 2003 video game
 XIII: The Conspiracy, a TV miniseries based on the comic book series and game of the same title
 XIII: The Series, a 2011 TV series based on the comic book series and miniseries
 XIII (Rage album), 1998
 XIII (Mushroomhead album), 2003
 XIII (TNT album), 2018
 Factor XIII, a clotting factor inside the coagulation cascade
 Rugby league, still often known as just XIII in France due to the name Rugby once being forbidden for the league code

See also
 Thirteen (disambiguation)
 Number 13 (disambiguation)
 Red XIII, a character from Final Fantasy VII
 Organization XIII, a fictional organization from the Kingdom Hearts series
 Final Fantasy XIII, a 2009 video game
 The Land Before Time XIII: The Wisdom of Friends, a 2007 film
 The King of Fighters XIII, a 2010 fighting video game